Pierre Sancan (24 October 1916 – 20 October 2008) was a French composer, pianist, teacher and conductor. Along with Olivier Messiaen and Henri Dutilleux, he was a major figure among French musicians in the mid-twentieth-century transition between modern and contemporary eras; but outside France his name is almost unknown.

Life
Born in Mazamet in the South of France, Sancan began in musical studies in Morocco and Toulouse before entering the Conservatoire de Paris where he studied with Jean Gallon, conducting with Charles Munch and Roger Désormière, piano with Yves Nat, and composition with Henri Busser.

In 1943, he won the Conservatoire's Prix de Rome for composition, with his cantata La Légende de Icare, but did not assume a regular teaching post there until 1956 when his former teacher Yves Nat retired. Sancan held this job until his own retirement in 1985. He lived another 23 years, to the age of 92, but his later years were compromised by Alzheimer's disease. He died in Paris.

Achievements
As a pianist, Sancan was most prominently seen in his role as accompanist to the great cellist André Navarra. His recordings of Ravel's two piano concertos with conductor Pierre Dervaux and Mozart's 4-hand concertos with Jean-Bernard Pommier were highly praised upon their release in the 1960s.

As a piano teacher, Sancan helped to train the successful pianists Olivier Cazal, Michel Béroff, Selman Ada, Abdel Rahman El Bacha, Emile Naoumoff, Géry Moutier, Jean-Bernard Pommier, Daniel Varsano, Jean-Efflam Bavouzet, Jacques Rouvier, Kristin Merscher, Eric Larsen, Jean-Marc Savelli, Selman Ada, and Jean-Philippe Collard who has recorded Sancan's Piano Concerto. Sancan's Sonatine for flute and piano (1946) is his best-known work, and has been a popular staple for flute players since its publication, but little else of his oeuvre is well known. Sancan also composed a Violin Concerto, at least three ballets, a Symphony for Strings (1961), and an opera, Ondine (1962). Some of his shorter piano pieces, such as Boîte à musique and the Toccata, have caught on as encore pieces.

Sancan sought to reconcile contemporary performance techniques with the harmonic language of Debussy, a composer of whom Sancan was an expert interpreter.

Selected filmography
 The Misfortunes of Sophie (1946)

Sources 
 Pierre Sancan (1916-2008)

External links 
 
 

1916 births
2008 deaths
20th-century French male classical pianists
20th-century French composers
20th-century French conductors (music)
Academic staff of the Conservatoire de Paris
Conservatoire de Paris alumni
French ballet composers
French male classical composers
French male conductors (music)
People from Mazamet
Prix de Rome for composition